was a Japanese football player. He played for Japan national team.

Club career
Matsumaru was born in Bunkyo, Tokyo on February 28, 1909. He played for Keio BRB was consisted of his alma mater Keio University players and graduates. At Keio BRB, he won 1932 and 1936 Emperor's Cup. He also played for Tokyo OB Club and won 1933 Emperor's Cup with Shigemaru Takenokoshi and Shiro Teshima.

National team career
In May 1934, Matsumaru was selected Japan national team for 1934 Far Eastern Championship Games in Manila. At this competition, on May 13, he debuted against Dutch East Indies. He also played against Philippines and Republic of China. He played 3 games for Japan in 1934.

Matsumaru died on January 6, 1997, at the age of 87. In 2015, he was selected Japan Football Hall of Fame.

National team statistics

References

External links
 
 Japan National Football Team Database

1909 births
1997 deaths
Keio University alumni
Association football people from Tokyo
Japanese footballers
Japan international footballers
Association football midfielders